Gustavo Salcedo (born 31 March 1952) is a Mexican former swimmer. He competed in two events at the 1972 Summer Olympics.

References

1952 births
Living people
Mexican male swimmers
Olympic swimmers of Mexico
Swimmers at the 1972 Summer Olympics
Place of birth missing (living people)